The Eagle 755 was a race car designed and built by Eagle for use in Formula 5000 racing and made its racing debut in 1975, and competed until 1976, when the SCCA Continental Championship dissolved. The Eagle 755 was powered by the commonly used 5.0-liter Chevrolet V8 engine.

References

Formula 5000 cars
Eagle racing cars